The Mary Lee Nichols School, located at 400-406 Pyramid Way in Sparks, Nevada, was built in 1917 and expanded in 1920 and 1927.  It was designed by architect Frederick DeLongchamps and it was also a work of U. Bernasconi.  DeLongchamps designed the 1920 and 1927 expansions as well.  It includes Mission/spanish Revival architecture.  It was listed on the National Register of Historic Places in 2002.

At the time of its NRHP listing, the school was in very good condition, with only very modest changes—including along its roofline—from the original appearance of the school.  It was then being modified for use by Spark's Foster Grandparent program.

References 

School buildings completed in 1917
National Register of Historic Places in Washoe County, Nevada
Mission Revival architecture in Nevada
Schools in Washoe County, Nevada
School buildings on the National Register of Historic Places in Nevada
1917 establishments in Nevada